Mammillaria spinosissima, also known as the spiny pincushion cactus, is a species of flowering plant in the cactus family Cactaceae, endemic to the central Mexican states of Guerrero and Morelos, where they grow at elevations of approximately . The species was described in 1838 by James Forbes, gardener of the Duke of Bedford. Botanist David Hunt collected a specimen in 1971, when he located one near Sierra de Tepoztlan, Mexico.

They reach full height after five to ten years. It grows low to the ground in solitary or in clusters, and its flowers produce generally bright red berries that are club-shaped, smooth, and juicy.

M. spinosissima thrive in well-drained soils that are sandy or loam, with a pH ranging from acidic to neutral. They prefer low humidity and full, filtered sun. Plants are typically watered once every two or three weeks, and kept nearly dry during the winter months. They require no pruning and make good patio and container plants. They are relatively disease resistant, but susceptible to pests such as mealybugs. Synonyms of M. spinosissima include Mammillaria centraliplumosa, Mammillaria haasii, and Mammillaria virginis.

Taxonomy

Carl Linnaeus designated Mammillaria as a type genus for cactus in 1753. In 1838, James Forbes, gardener of the Duke of Bedford, listed and described a species he called Echinocactus spinosissimas from a group of cacti he had acquired in Europe three years earlier. Nathaniel Lord Britton and Joseph Nelson Rose believe that Forbes was given that name by Ludwig Karl Georg Pfeiffer, but the plant was actually Mammillaria spinosissima.

Pfeiffer had published the first infrageneric division of Mammillaria in 1837, dividing the genus into two groups based on distinct spine characteristics. In 1845, Joseph zu Salm-Reifferscheidt-Dyck – based on work by Frederick Scheer – expanded the classification into eight groups. With at least 145 recognized species, it is one of the largest and most morphologically variable genera in the cactus family. Others estimate there are as many as two hundred species of Mammillaria, including sixty-two cultivated species from India. Though larger, the genus Opuntia is less popular with gardeners and landscapers. Mammillaria was previously thought to be monophyletic, but phylogenic analysis indicates that Mammilloydia is "embedded within a 'core' group of Mammillaria species."

Similar species, subspecies and synonyms
Species similar to Mammillaria spinosissima include Mammillaria backebergiana and Mammillaria meyranii. Subspecies include M. spinosissima pilcayensis, synonym: Bravo (D. R. Hunt), M. spinosissima tepoxtlana (D. R. Hunt), and M. spinosissima spinosissima (Lem.). Synonyms of M. spinosissima include Mammillaria centraliplumosa (Fittkau), Mammillaria haasii (J. Meyrán), and Mammillaria virginis (Fittkau and Kladiwa).

Description

They reach full height after five to ten years. The relatively small cacti are globular or elongated, and the flowers produce generally bright red berries that are club-shaped, smooth, and juicy.

Mammillaria species tend to grow low to the ground in solitary or grouped in clusters. The genus is marked by its dimorphic areoles: the spine bearing, or vegetative, areoles are located on the apex of the tubercle, and flowering areoles are located inside the axils of the tubercles. The stem is woolly and covered with bristles.

Native habitat
The genus Mammillaria native habitat ranges from Colombia and Venezuela to the Southwestern United States. Its diversity is greatest in Mexico. Species have also been documented in the West Indies. The subspecies pilcayensis is named for its occurrence in the Barranca de Pilcaya, in Guerrero.

Cultivation
Britton and Rose believe that M. spinosissima has been in cultivation since at least 1835. The species thrives in well-drained soils that are sandy or loam, with a pH that is acidic, alkaline, or neutral. They prefer low humidity, and grow well under glass, with full, filtered sun from the south, north, and east. Plants are typically watered once every couple of weeks, and kept nearly dry during the winter months. Propagation is facilitated by offsets of seeds sown in early spring in  weather. They require no pruning and make good patio and container plants. They are disease resistant, but are susceptible to pests such as mealybugs. This plant has gained the Royal Horticultural Society’s Award of Garden Merit.

Gallery

Notes

Bibliography

External links
 
 

spinosissima
Cacti of Mexico
Endemic flora of Mexico
North American desert flora
Flora of Guerrero
Plants described in 1891